The rose-crowned fruit dove (Ptilinopus regina), also known as pink-capped fruit dove or Swainson's fruit dove, is a medium-sized, up to 22 cm long, green fruit dove with a grey head and breast, an orange belly, whitish throat, yellow-orange iris, and greyish green bill and feet. It has a pinkish-red crown with yellow border. The Indonesian subspecies, P. r. xanthogaster, has a whitish crown and paler grey head and breast. Both sexes are similar. The young has a green-colored crown and plumage.

The rose-crowned fruit dove is distributed in lowland rainforests of northern and eastern Australia, and monsoon forests of northern Australia, Lesser Sunda Islands and Maluku Islands of Indonesia. The diet consists mainly of various fruits, palms and vines. The female usually lays a single white egg.

Widespread and common throughout its large range, the rose-crowned fruit dove is evaluated as Least Concern on the IUCN Red List of Threatened Species.

References

External links 

 BirdLife Species Factsheet

rose-crowned fruit dove
Birds of Australia
Birds of the Lesser Sunda Islands
rose-crowned fruit dove